was a professional wrestling event promoted by World Wonder Ring Stardom. The event took place on February 26, 2023, in Kobe at the Kobe International Exhibition Hall.

Background
The Stardom in Showcase is a series of pay-per-views which mainly focuses on a diversity of gimmick matches, only different from the singles match stipulation. Billed as respiro shows, the main tagline of these events is "Anything can happen".

The show featured seven professional wrestling matches that resulted from scripted storylines, where wrestlers portrayed villains, heroes, or less distinguishable characters in the scripted events that built tension and culminated in a wrestling match or series of matches.

Event
The show started with the comedic "triathlon" competition between Saya Iida and P.P.P. Tokyo's Chanyota which included three different types of contests. An arm wrestling match, a usual singles match and a muscular posing contest. Chanyota won the posing and the arm wrestling match while Iida imposed herself in the usual singles wrestling match. The second bout saw a Falls count anywhere match following an event which took place a couple of weeks before the show in which then-time High Speed Champion AZM and Rossy Ogawa celebrated AZM's 20th birthday with a couple of drinks at the bar ran by Sumire Natsu (in Japan, the age of twenty represents the legal elderliness for alcohol consumption). At the bar, Sumire attacked Ogawa which degenerated in the traditional four-way match of the "Showcase" branch. AZM picked up the victory after pinning Hanan. Since joining Cosmic Angels in late 2021, Waka Tsukiyama would undergo a long-term losing streak. Obviously not happy about it, unit leader Tam Nakano demanded that Tsukiyama must focus on getting a win and breaking her loss record, otherwise she would be kicked out of the stable. The situation degenerated in a Captain's fall six-woman elimination tag team match in which Tsukiyama teamed up with Mina Shirakawa and Mariah May in order to attempt to get a win against the stablemates team of Tam Nakano, Natsupoi and Saki to keep herself as a member of the unit (Nakano gave her an ultimatum to get a win several weeks before the event). Tsukiyama's team lost, however, Nakano decided to keep her into the unit and furtherly team up with her to face Nanae Takahashi at Stardom New Blood Premium on March 25 and challenged Takahashi to bring up her best partner. The fourth match saw the Super Stardom Machine Army, three masked characters portraited by Saya Iida, Lady C and Yuna Mizumori defeating an undentified team of three reaper masked "momos". The fifth match saw Giulia, Maika and Himeka going into a no-contest against the time's Artist of Stardom Champions Suzu Suzuki, Risa Sera and Hiragi Kurumi as a result of a hardcore six-woman tag team match. The bout was one of Himeka's wishes before her retirement. In the semi main event, Syuri defeated Saki Kashima in an UWF rules match.

In the main event, Stars (Mayu Iwatani, Hazuki and Koguma) defeated Queen's Quest (Utami Hayashishita, Saya Kamitani and Miyu Amasaki) and Oedo Tai (Natsuko Tora, Starlight Kid and Momo Watanabe to receive local high-quality Kobe beef.

Results

Notes

References

External links
Page Stardom World

2023 in professional wrestling
World Wonder Ring Stardom shows
Women's professional wrestling shows
World Wonder Ring Stardom
Professional wrestling in Japan